Ninagaagi Kaadiruve is a 2009 Indian Kannada-language film directed by Jolly Bastian starring Vishal Hegde and Pooja Gandhi in lead roles.

Cast

 Vishal Hegde as Nandan
 Pooja Gandhi as Swetha
 Dileep Raj as Vishwas
 M. S. Umesh
 Suresh Mangalore
 Mohan Juneja
 Bank Suresh
 Dr Vijaykumar
 Rakesh Lobo

Music

Reception

Critical response 

R G Vijayasarathy of Rediff.com scored the film at 1.5 out of 5 stars and says "Pooja Gandhi looks glamorous in the song sequences, but her performance is average. Vishal Hegde is the pick of the lot. Dileep scores in the villain's role though it is not well defined. The Bahumaanavaadhe song is well composed by Robin Gurang. Camera work is just passable. All in all, Ninagaagi Kaadiruve is a big yawn. Watch it only if you do not have any other alternative". A critic from Deccan Herald wrote "Touted a suspense-thriller-cum-love story, ‘Ninagagi...’ preys on viewers’ nerves. Coming just a week after ‘Huchchi’, Pooja’s nervous pants and shrieks do not register, damaging the nearly non-existent storyline. She should also be taught the nuances of diction. Another mystery is why an actor like Dileep Raj chose such a role. Jolly Bastian has taken everyone for a jolly ride with this one". A critic from Bangalore Mirror wrote "Though it is commendable that Pooja Gandhi is dubbing for her roles, her accent adds to the snickering moments for the audience. Ninagaagi Kaadiruve is not a bad film and is worth a watch but it could have been much better".

References

2000s Kannada-language films
2009 films